Jack de Keyzer is a British-born Canadian blues guitarist, vocalist, songwriter and producer. He has twice won the Juno Award, Canada's highest musical honour, and seven times received Maple Blues Awards, including for Blues Album of the Year in 2000 and the Lifetime Achievement Award in 2001. Real Blues Magazine crowned him Live Act Of The Year in 2001, and has twice named him Guitarist of the Year.

Career
Jack de Keyzer received Juno Awards for Blues Album of the Year in 2003 and 2010, respectively for 6 String Lover and for The Corktown Sessions. He also won first prize in the 2007 International Songwriting Competition for his song "That's the Only Time".

His career has spanned four decades. He is a former member of Hamilton band The Bopcats – a rockabilly group, who released two albums in the 1980s on Attic Records. After leaving The Bopcats, he became one of The Rock Angels, releasing an independent EP in 1983. His solo work began in 1989. His first CD release, Hard Working Man, was produced by Stacey Heydon. The album made a name for de Keyzer in the Canadian blues industry through the successful singles "Blue Train" (Produced by Danny Greenspoon), "That's the Way" and "Nothing In the World". The single "That's the Way" reached No. 13 on Rock Radio.

He has released eleven CDs and one DVD as a solo artist and has appeared as a session guitarist on hundreds of recordings. As a session guitarist he worked with Etta James, Otis Rush, John Hammond, Jr., Ronnie Hawkins, Duke Robillard, Robert Gordon, Willy Big Eyes Smith, Bo Diddley & Blue Rodeo.

Jack de Keyzer’s songs have also appeared in video, rock & blues radio charts, other artists' CDs (Prairie Oyster's platinum CD Everyone Knows), TV soundtracks, as well as in films (The Michelle Apartments, My Father's Shoes) and on television (Traders, PSI Factor).

In 2009, de Keyzer received accolades from two very Canadian institutions. First, Prime Minister Stephen Harper's son, Ben, received a guitar lesson from him by request from first lady Laureen Harper at the Prime Minister's residence. Later that year de Keyzer was also named Great Canadian Blues Artist of the Year by CBC radio listeners.

Discography
 1991 Hard Working Man
 1994 Wild at Heart
 1999 Down in the Groove – Jazz Report Award for Blues Album of the Year 2000; Maple Blues Award for Blues Album of the Year 2000
 2003 6 String Lover – Juno Award for Blues Album of the Year 2003
 2005 Silver Blues – Durham Region Music Award for Blues Recording of the Year 2005
 2006 Silver Blues (DVD)
 2007 Blues Thing – Juno Award nomination for Album of the Year
 2009 The Corktown Sessions – Juno Award for Blues Album of the Year 2010
 2012 Electric Love Juno Award nomination for Album of the Year
 2014 Voodoo Boogie
 2017 The Best of Jack de Keyzer (Volume One)
 2018 Checkmate
 2020 Tribute

References

External links

Canadian blues guitarists
Canadian male guitarists
Canadian session musicians
Musicians from London
Living people
Juno Award for Blues Album of the Year winners
Year of birth missing (living people)